"Looks That Kill" is a song by American heavy metal band Mötley Crüe. It was released as a single in January 1984. The song is considered one of their best.

Background
The track was written by bassist Nikki Sixx and spent 10 weeks on the Billboard Hot 100 chart in the United States, peaking at #54 and #12 on the Mainstream Rock Tracks.

Music video
The music video was filmed at A&M Records' main sound stage. It features the band in a post-apocalyptic setting where they trap a group of women in a cage while performing the song. In the middle of the video, the warrior queen (played by Wendy Barry) appears to release the women before confronting the band. The band follows and surrounds her, but she disappears, leaving a flaming pentagram on the ground.

Track listing
 "Looks That Kill" – 4:07
 "Piece of Your Action"

Personnel
Vince Neil – lead vocals
Mick Mars – guitar
Nikki Sixx – bass
Tommy Lee – drums, percussion

Charts

References

Mötley Crüe songs
1984 singles
Songs written by Nikki Sixx
Song recordings produced by Tom Werman
1983 songs
Elektra Records singles